Mario Sanchez may refer to:

 Mario Sanchez (artist), Cuban-American folk artist
 Mario Sánchez (footballer), Mexican footballer
 Mario Sánchez (sport shooter), Mexican sport shooter
 Mario Sánchez (squash player), Mexican squash player
 Mario Sanchez (soccer), retired American soccer forward 
 Mario Ernesto Sánchez, actor and theater founder
 Mario Sánchez Yantén (born 1956), retired Chilean football referee